Fernand Secheer (24 January 1908 – 17 March 1988) was a French politician.

Secheer was born in Biaudos on 24 January 1908. Secheer died on 17 March 1988 in Bayonne.

References

1908 births
1988 deaths
French Section of the Workers' International politicians
Deputies of the 2nd National Assembly of the French Fifth Republic
People from Bayonne